"Now We're Starting Over Again" is a romantic ballad composed by Michael Masser and lyricist Gerry Goffin first recorded by Dionne Warwick in 1981 as "Now We're Starting Over Again".  The song was most successful as a 1989 single release by Natalie Cole.

Dionne Warwick version
"Now We're Starting Over Again" was one of five studio recordings by Dionne Warwick to augment the concert tracks on her 1981 album Hot! Live and Otherwise: three of these studio tracks were produced and co-written by Michael Masser being – besides "Now We're Starting Over Again" – "There's a Long Road Ahead of Us" (also co-written with Gerry Goffin) and "Some Changes Are For Good" (co-written with Carole Bayer Sager), with the latter two tracks being chosen for single release in the U.S. Also, "Now We're Starting Over Again" was afforded a single release in some countries though without becoming a major hit, with its only evident chart showing being in the UK where it peaked at #76.

Natalie Cole cover
Natalie Cole's version of "Now We're Starting Over Again" (simply titled as "Starting Over Again") was released in late 1989 in the UK and early 1990 in the U.S., being the fifth of five singles released from her 1989 album Good to Be Back, the first of which: "Miss You Like Crazy" (#7 on the Billboard Hot 100/ #1 R&B) having been – like "Starting Over Again" – a Michael Masser production and co-write, "Miss You Like Crazy" being Cole's second major hit produced by Masser and written by Masser and Gerry Goffin, the first being "Someone That I Used to Love" (#21 on the Billboard Hot 100/ #21 R&B) (1980). "Starting Over Again" did not afford Cole a Hot 100 or R&B hit but did chart on Billboard magazine's Adult Contemporary chart at number five, also reaching 12 on the Canadian Adult Contemporary chart. "Starting Over Again" was also a minor hit in the UK (#56). The B-side of the single was Cole's duet with Freddie Jackson entitled "I Do" which in a previous release had been a Top Ten R&B chart hit.

Chart history
Dionne Warwick original

Natalie Cole version

Notable cover versions
 Filipina singer Lani Misalucha recorded "Starting Over Again" for the 2014 movie of the same name.

References

External links
 Lyrics of this song
 
 

Natalie Cole songs
Dionne Warwick songs
Songs with lyrics by Gerry Goffin
Songs written by Michael Masser
Song recordings produced by Gerry Goffin
Arista Records singles
EMI Records singles
1981 songs
1981 singles
1989 singles
Contemporary R&B ballads
Soul ballads
1980s ballads
Quiet storm songs